Falih Rıfkı Atay Nature Park is a nature park located in Sarıyer district of Istanbul Province, Turkey. 

It was established in 2011, and is one of the nine nature parks inside the Belgrad Forest. The protected area is named in honor of journalist, writer and politician Falih Rıfkı Atay (1894–1971).

Serbs who were taken prisoners of war at the Siege of Belgrade (1521) by Ottoman sultan Suleiman the Magnificent (reigned 1520–1566), were brought to Istanbul and settled in a village, which used to lie within the park boundaries. The nature park contains the ruins of a church, which is a protected historic building and was registered as cultural heritage in November 1999.

The nature park offers outdoor recreational activities such as hiking, cycling and picnicing for visitors on daily basis. There are playgrounds for children. Admission is charged for visitors and vehicles and an open-air restaurant serves the visitors.

Ecosystem
The nature park has rich flora and fauna.

Flora

The park is the habitat for diverse species of plant. The main trees present are oak (Quercus robur) and  hornbeam (Carpinus betulus). Other deciduous trees include sessile oak (Quercus petraea), kasnak oak (Quercus vulcanica) and shrubs are blackberry (Rubus plicatus), butcher's-broom (Ruscus aculeatus), tree heath (Erica arborea) and bay laurel (Laurus nobilis). Some uncommon  trees include silver linden (Tilia argentea) and oriental beech (Fagus orientalis). Anatolian catbrier (Smilax excelsa), aubrietia (Aubrieta cultorum), wild strawberry (Fragaria) and catnip (Nepeta cataria) are some of the flowering plants found in the nature park.

Fauna

Mainly observed fauna of the nature park are  porcupines, squirrels, turtles, magpies, crows, woodpeckers, sparrows and finches.  Across the nature park, there is a deer farm.

See also
 Ayvat Bendi Nature Park
 Bentler Nature Park
 Fatih Çeşmesi Nature Park
 Irmak Nature Park
 Kirazlıbent Nature Park
 Kömürcübent Nature Park
 Mehmet Akif Ersoy Nature Park
 Neşet Suyu Nature Park

References

Nature parks in Turkey
Protected areas established in 2011
2011 establishments in Turkey
Parks in Istanbul
Sarıyer
Belgrad Forest